Dune is a perfume for women by Parfums Christian Dior, introduced in 1991. It was created by perfumers Jean-Louis Sieuzac and Maurice Roger. Some controversy about the perfume ensued when another perfumer claimed that she was the owner of the intellectual property of the fragrance, a matter that came to trial at the French Cour de cassation. Dune is described as an homage to Christian Dior's birthplace Granville, "where sea meets land".

Dior released a spin-off fragrance for men, "Dune pour Homme", in 1997. It was created by perfumer Jean-Pierre Bethouart.

References

External links
 Dune at Basenotes
 Dune pour Homme at Basenotes

Dior
Perfumes
Products introduced in 1991